Amjad Islam Amjad, PP, Sitara-e-Imtiaz (4 August 1944 – 10 February 2023) was a Pakistani Urdu poet, screenwriter, playwright and lyricist. 

The author of more than 70 books, he received many awards for his literary work and screenplay for TV, including Pride of Performance and Sitara-e-Imtiaz (Star of Excellence) Awards. Later on, he also received the prestigious Tamgh-e-Imtiaz in 1998.

Biography
Amjad was born in Lahore, Punjab in British India (now Pakistan). His family originally belonged to Sialkot. He received his secondary education in Lahore, and graduated from Government Islamia College Civil Lines, Lahore. He was also member of the college cricket team and participated in the inter collegiate tournament. He gained a Masters of Arts degree in Urdu literature from Punjab University. He began his career as a lecturer in Govt. M.A.O. College Lahore. He worked as a director at Pakistan Television Corporation from 1975 to 1979, before returning to teaching.

In 1989, Amjad was appointed Director General of the Urdu Science Board. He had also worked as a project director of the Children Library Complex. Amjad is the writer of many drama series for Pakistan Television Corporation including Waris. He has written many columns, translation, criticism and essays while his main focus remained writing nazms, a type of Urdu poetry. Among his most notable dramas are Dehleez, Samandar, Raat, Waqt and Apnay Log.

He wrote the lyrics of Mann Ki Lagan for the 2003 movie Paap, the song which launched the Bollywood career of Rahat Fateh Ali Khan.

In June 2008, he joined Urdu newspaper Daily Express and wrote column with the title of Chasham-e-Tamasha.

In December 2019, Amjad received the Necip Fazil International Culture and Art Award in Istanbul, Turkey.

Amjad died from a cardiac arrest on 10 February 2023, at the age of 78.

Amjad Islam Amjad's Work 
Amjad Islam Amjad has been a vital part of the literary world. some of his famous dramas include; Varis, Din, Fishar and many more. In 1975, his famous TV drama Khuwab Jaagtay Hain won an award.

He also translated the poetries of the African poets in Urdu called Kale Logon ki Roshan Nazmein.

Amjad Islam Amjad also wrote dramas based on criticism. He has been honoured with many national and international awards.

Awards and honours 
 Sitara-i-Imtiaz (Star of Excellence) Award by the President of Pakistan (1998)
 Pride of Performance Award by the President of Pakistan (1987)
 National Hijra Iqbal Award (Best Book of Poetry: Fishaar) (1982)
 Writers Guild Award (Best Translation Work: Aks) (1976)
 Best Playwright, PTV Awards (1980, 1984, 1998, 1999 and 2001)
 Karachi Arts Council Award, (Best Book of Prose: Nai Puraney) (1991) 
 Special President Award (TV Serial: Waris) (1980) 
 Best Nazam Nigar of the Year "Biaaz" Award (2005) 
 Best Film Writer Nigar Award (2 Awards) (1982–1987) 
 Agfa Award (1987)
 Bolan Award (2 Awards) (1987–1995) 
 TV Serial Waris (Published in Chinese Language) (1987)
 TV Serial Waris (Dubbed in Chinese Language & Telecasted on Chinese TV National Network) (1988)
 Amjad Islam Amjad Art & Personality (Compilation Of Writings About Art & Personality of Amjad Islam Amjad) (1996) 
 Special Edition of Monthly ”Chahaar Su" (2001)
 Special Edition of Monthly "Biaaz" (2003)
 Jashn-E-Amjad Islam Amjad, Doha- Dubai (2001) 
 PTV Awards (12 total including Silver Jubilee Award) (1989)
 Recipient of Graduate Awards (16 Awards total as 'Best Writer') (1975 To 2000) 
 National Award, Best Book of Poetry "Sahilon Ki Hawa"  (2000) 
 Ahmed Nadeem Qasmi Award, Best Book of Poetry "Yaheen Kaheen" (2006)

Bibliography

PTV drama serials
 Waris (1979 to 1980)
 Dehleez (1981)
 Samandar (1983)
 Waqt (1986)
 Fishaar
 Raat 
 Din (1992)
 Eendhen
 Inkaar
 Chacha Abdul Baqi (short)
 Daman Ki Aag (short)
 Lahu Meain Phool (short)

Private serials
 Agar
 Girah
 Zamana
 Bandagi
 Sheeraza
 Sher-Dil

Long plays (PTV)
 Bazdeed
 Dukhon Ki Chadar
 Apney Log
 Laikin
 Dhund Ke Uss Par
 Sham Se Pehley
 Nizam Lohaar
 Ghanti
 TV, TV
 Ye Kinara Chala Ke Naau Chali
 Baazgasht
 Abhi Tou Mein Jawan Hun
 Mutthi Se Phisalti Rait
 Aag Sab Ko Jalati Hai
 Johar
 Nazdeek

Short plays (25 minutes, PTV)
 Jo Yun Hota Tou Kya Hota
 Aap Kal Aaiye
 Taale Mand Ki Pareshaniyan
 Deewar Ke Iss Par-Uss Par
 Makan Ki Talaash Mein
 Shauq Bohat Hai
 Sheesha-O-Sang

General plays (50 minutes, PTV)
 Aakhri Khawab (1973)
 Barzakh (1974)
 Moum Ki Guriya (1974)
 Khwab Jagtey Hain (1975)
 Ya Naseeb Clinic
 Balkani
 Sauda
 Ahl-E-Nazar
 Shabzad
 Rubaroo
 Suragh E Sahar
 Pichli Raat Ka Chand
 Sawaal
 Mere Bhi Hain Kuch Khwab
 Gardish
 Jaras
 Bachon Ka Bagh
 Ehsas E Ziyan
 Apna Ghar
 Zindagi Ke Miley Mein
 Ulti Churri
 Sooraj Bhi Tamashai
 Paras Pathar
 Doosra Qadam
 Apney Hissey Ka Bhouj
 Tawaan
 Isi Ka Naam Duniya Hai
 Ghairon Se Kaha Tum Ne
 Idher Udher Se
 Zero Point
 Abhi Nahi Kabhi Nahi
 Tasalsul
 Girti Hui Deewar
 Aakhri Tamatar
 Qutab Sitara
 Qafla E Sakht Jan
 Ghar
 Pewasta Reh Shajar Se
 Phir Yun Huwa
 Apni Khudi Pehchaan
 Mere Khawab Reza Reza
 Bakrey Ki Shadi
 Basharat
 Zero Point 2
 Bara Andhera Hai
 Eesaar
 Eid Ka Tohfa

Adapted plays
 Kan Russ
 Bandagi Bechargi
 Bura Aadmi
 Aks Aur Aainey
 Dehaktey Khwab
 Waris
 Manzil Hai Kahan
 Gard Bad E Hayat
 Rifi Ki Duniya
 Ehsaan
 Sannata
 Baitey Baitiyan
 Amar Bail
 Hisaab
 Summander Ke Nichey
 Dou Gaz Zameen
 Namak Haram
 Ghanti
 Bara Andhera Hai
 Barf Mein Lagi Aag
 Chacha Abdul Baqi
 Lahu Mei Phool

Punjabi plays
 Nehle Te Dehla
 Khauta Sikka
 Bhukh

Plays for children
 Jadu Ki Sheeshi
 Bahadur Shehzada
 Daal Mei Kala

Stage plays
 Ghar Aya Mehmaan
 Dastak
 Kis Ko Keh Rahe Ho

Short films
 Doosri Taraf
 Beneath The Sea

Tele film
 Aaina

Audio albums 
 Muhabbat Aisa Darya Hai
 Hum Us Ke Hain
 Raat Sammundar Mein
 Mere Bhi Hain Kuch Khawab
 More than 150 of his songs for films, TV And radio have been recorded by singers Nusrat Fateh Ali Khan, Ustad Hamid Ali Khan, folk and sufi songs performer Abida Parveen, ghazal singers Ghulam Ali, Iqbal Bano, Jagjit Singh, Noor Jehan and many other singers.

Publications

See also
 List of Pakistani poets
 List of Pakistani writers
 List of Urdu language poets
 List of Urdu language writers

References

External links
 Daily Dharti

1944 births
2023 deaths
Poets from Lahore
Pakistani poets
Punjabi people
Urdu-language poets from Pakistan
Pakistani dramatists and playwrights
Pakistani columnists
Pakistani television writers
Nigar Award winners
Writers from Lahore
University of the Punjab alumni
Recipients of the Pride of Performance
Recipients of Sitara-i-Imtiaz
Urdu-language travel writers
Pakistani travel writers
PTV Award winners
20th-century screenwriters
21st-century screenwriters
20th-century Pakistani poets
21st-century Pakistani poets
20th-century Pakistani male writers
21st-century Pakistani male writers